Adrian Chase is an antihero appearing in American comic books published by DC Comics. He is the second DC character to bear the name Vigilante.

The character made his live-action debut in the Arrowverse series Arrow, portrayed by Josh Segarra. In the DC Extended Universe television series Peacemaker, he is played by Freddie Stroma.

Publication history
Created by writer Marv Wolfman and artist George Pérez, Adrian Chase first appeared in his civilian identity in The New Teen Titans #23 (September 1982), before debuting as Vigilante in The New Teen Titans Annual #2 (August 1983). Chase later appeared in his own Vigilante series.

Fictional character biography
Adrian Chase was a New York City district attorney working on part with the resident team, the Teen Titans. He sought justice his own way as the anti-hero Vigilante after his wife Doris Chase and their children were killed by Scarapelli mobsters. Chase was initially shown taking pains to make sure he did not kill his enemies (unlike the Punisher from Marvel Comics) and would regularly use non-lethal weapons to disable his opponents.

Throughout the Vigilante series, Chase was tormented over the justice of his actions and the pain brought to others. Chase flirted with abandoning his Vigilante identity after he savagely beat an ex-convict who turned out to be innocent. Eventually, Chase did abandon his Vigilante identity, believing that he could be both more effective and happier as a judge. But during his absence, the Vigilante identity was assumed by two of his friends (fellow judge Alan Wells and then bailiff Dave Winston respectively) without his knowledge.

After Wells killed a police officer and Winston died at Peacemaker's hands, Chase once again assumed the Vigilante role, believing it was the only way to protect his loved ones. However, his experiences with Welles and Winston had damaged his fragile psyche beyond repair, causing him to adopt more vicious tactics in his war on crime. Seeking revenge on Peacemaker, the out of shape Adrian gets beaten in a fight and unmasked on live TV, thereby ending Chase's secret identity and forcing him even further into the Vigilante role.

Eventually, Chase became ever more conflicted over the violence he engaged in and the harm he caused to those around him. He also became increasingly mentally unstable—alternating between bouts of enraged violence, paranoia and terrible remorse for his actions, even resorting to murdering innocent police officers who got in his way. His mounting guilt culminated in Chase contemplating the course of his life and then completing suicide.

Before his death, he frequently battled Cannon and Saber and Electrocutioner.

Chase appeared in the Day of Judgment limited series, as one of the dead heroes in Purgatory. He and the others run interference, battling the guardians of the realm, so other living heroes can escape with the soul of Hal Jordan. When the crisis concluded with Jordan assuming the Spectre mantle, Jim Corrigan appeared briefly on Earth, stating that the efforts of Chase and other heroes in Purgatory had earned an appeal in the shining city.

It was revealed that Adrian is the brother of Dorian Chase.

Powers and abilities
As the Vigilante, Adrian Chase is a superb hand-to-hand combatant, a brilliant marksman, and a master of the lariat. He also possessed the ability to heal quickly and regenerate his body from injuries as serious as stabbings or gun shot wounds, although he is capable of dying if the injuries are severe enough.

In other media
 Variations of Adrian Chase appear in Arrow, portrayed by Josh Segarra.
 The Earth-1 incarnation appears in the fifth season as an alias of Simon Morrison / Prometheus. After his father Justin Claybourne's death, he vowed revenge and conducted research into Claybourne's murderer, eventually learning it is Oliver Queen. After seeking out Talia al Ghul to train him in the League of Assassins' ways, Chase targets and haunts Queen and the latter's allies, manipulates Artemis, and recruits Black Siren to his cause. While Team Arrow eventually deduce his identity, Chase kidnaps William Clayton and captures Queen's teammates to lure to the island Lian Yu. In their ensuing fight, Chase reveals he has rigged the island with explosives and that the trigger is in his brain before killing himself, though Queen and most of the captives survive.
 An Earth-2 doppelgänger of Chase appears in the eighth season episode "Starling City" as the Hood. Queen encounters Chase while the former is on Earth-2 to prepare for an impending Crisis and they work together despite initial difficulties.
 Adrian Chase / Vigilante appears in Peacemaker, portrayed by Freddie Stroma. This version is a busboy and self-proclaimed crimefighter who looks up to Peacemaker and displays sociopathic and socially awkward tendencies.

References

External links
 Vigilante (Adrian Chase) at the DCU Guide
 
 Titans Tower Profile: Vigilante II (Adrian Chase)
 Earth-1 Vigilante (Adrian Chase) Index
 Post-Crisis Vigilante (Adrian Chase) Index

Fictional lawyers
Comics characters introduced in 1983
1983 comics debuts
Fictional judges
Fictional assassins in comics
Fictional detectives
Characters created by Marv Wolfman
Characters created by George Pérez
DC Comics superheroes
Fictional characters from New York (state)
Fictional marksmen and snipers
Vigilante characters in comics
DC Comics characters with accelerated healing
DC Comics martial artists
Fictional suicides